

1989–90

European Cup

First round

European Cup Winners' Cup

First round

UEFA Cup

First round

1990–91

European Cup

First round

European Cup Winners' Cup

Qualifying round

First round

UEFA Cup

First round

Second round

1991–92

European Cup

First round

European Cup Winners' Cup

First round

Second round

Third Round

UEFA Cup

First round

Second round

Third round

1 This match was played in Klagenfurt due to the outbreak of the Croatian War of Independence.

1992–93

UEFA Champions League

First round

UEFA Cup Winners' Cup

First round

Second round

UEFA Cup

First round

Second round

Third round

1993–94

UEFA Champions League

First round

Second round

Group stage

Group A

UEFA Cup Winners' Cup

First round

Second round

UEFA Cup

First round

Second round

1994–95

UEFA Champions League

Qualifying round

Group stage

Group A

UEFA Cup Winners' Cup

First round

Second round

UEFA Cup

Preliminary round

First round

Second round

Third round

1995–96

UEFA Champions League

Qualifying round

UEFA Cup Winners' Cup

First round

Second round

UEFA Cup

Preliminary round

First round

1996–97

UEFA Champions League

Qualifying round

Group stage

Group C

UEFA Cup Winners' Cup

First round

Second round

UEFA Cup

Qualifying round

First round

Second round

Third round

1997–98

UEFA Champions League

Second qualifying round

Group stage

Group A

Group E

UEFA Cup Winners' Cup

First round

Second round

UEFA Cup

Second qualifying round

First round

1998–99

UEFA Champions League

Second qualifying round

Group stage

Group B

UEFA Cup Winners' Cup

First round

Second round

UEFA Cup

Second qualifying round

First round

References

External links
UEFA Website
Rec.Sport.Soccer Statistics Foundation